April Story is a Japanese film directed by Shunji Iwai starring Takako Matsu.

Plot
Uzuki Nireno, a shy girl from the countryside of northern Hokkaidō, leaves her family and gets on a train bound for Tokyo so she can attend the university of her choice; to be near the boy she fell in love with, who moved to Tokyo from her hometown.

Cast
Takako Matsu as Uzuki Nireno  	
Seiichi Tanabe as Yamazaki 	 	
Kahori Fujii as Teruko Kitao
Kazuhiko Kato as The Man in the Art Gallery
Go Jibiki
Matsumoto Kōshirō IX as Uzuki's father
Ichikawa Somegorō VII as Uzuki's brother
Yōsuke Eguchi as Oda Nobunaga
Tatsuya Ishii as Akechi Mitsuhide

Crew
Director/Writer: Shunji Iwai  	
Director of Photography: Noboru Shinoda 	
Lighting Director: Yuki Nakamura 	
Production Designer: Yuji Tsuzuki

DVD Editions
Japanese R2 (No English Subtitles)
Korean R3 (English Subtitles)
Hong Kong R3 (Japanese dialogue, English / Full Chinese subtitles)

Festivals
Toronto International Film Festival, 1998
Pusan International Film Festival, 1998

Awards
1998 Pusan International Film Festival: Audience Award

References

External links
 

1998 films
1990s Japanese films
1990s Japanese-language films
Films directed by Shunji Iwai